Anadasmus incitatrix is a moth of the family Depressariidae. It is found in northern Argentina and Paraná, Brazil.

The wingspan is about 28 mm. The forewings are pale pinkish-ochreous with the costal edge ochreous-whitish. The plical and second discal stigmata are dark grey and there is a marginal series of dark grey dots around the apex and termen. The hindwings are ochreous-whitish, tinged greyish-ochreous towards the apex.

References

Moths described in 1925
Anadasmus
Moths of South America